"Stand Strong" is a song by Nigerian singer Davido, released on 13 May 2022, through Davido Music Worldwide, and distributed by Sony Music Entertainment UK. "Stand Strong" was written by Davido and The Samples, a member of the American gospel group Sunday Service Choir and produced by Pheelz. The music video was released on 25 May 2022. It also peaked at number 6 on TurnTable Top 50 chart, it peaked at number 9 on the Billboard U.S. Afrobeats Songs chart and UK Afrobeats Singles chart.

Background
Davido and Pheelz served as the executive producers of "Stand Strong". Pheelz handled the beat production, with the help of Jason White, who is the choir director of The Sample, handled the choir vocal production, with Bankulli, who is an A&R, overseeing the Samples vocal production. Davido released "Stand Strong" on 13 May 2022, as the lead single from his next studio album.

Commercial performance
During its debut week, "Stand Strong" peaked at number two on Apple Music in Nigeria. On 22 May 2022, it debuted at number 9 on the UK Afrobeats Singles chart. On 23 May 2022, it debuted at number 6 on the Nigeria TurnTable Top 50 chart. On 25 May 2022, it debuted at number 9 on the Billboard U.S. Afrobeats Songs chart, and TurnTable Top 50 Streaming Songs chart, it also debuted at number 2 on the TurnTable Top 50 Airplay. "Stand Strong" has received 4.7 million Boomplay streams as of 27 May 2022.

Charts

Release history

References

2022 songs
2022 singles
Davido songs
Song recordings produced by Pheelz
Nigerian afropop songs